The fixture list for the 2022 RFL League 1 season was released on 13 November 2021.  The regular season, comprising 22 rounds, started on Saturday 26 March 2022 and ended on Sunday 4 September 2022.

All times are UK summer time (UTC+01:00) on the relevant dates, except the match on 26 March 2022 which is UK winter time (UTC±00:00).

Regular season

Round 1

Round 2

Round 3

Round 4

Round 5

Round 6

Round 7

Round 8

Round 9

Round 10

Round 11

Round 12

Round 13

Round 14

Round 15

Round 16

Round 17

Round 18

Round 19

Round 20

Round 21

Round 22

Play-offs
The play-offs follow the same structure used since 2019. The teams finishing second to fifth in the regular season compete over a four round play-off series. In each round one team is eliminated with the winners of the play-off final joining Keighley in being promoted to the 2023 Championship.  

All matches are played at the ground of the higher placed team.  The team finishing second in the regular season has a bye to the second round of the play-offs and home advantage in their matches.  In the first round - the qualifying and elimination play-offs - the team losing the elimination play-off is out of play-offs. The winners of the elimination play-off meet the losers of the qualifying play-off in the second round - the semi finals.

The team losing the elimination semi-final is out, while the winners go through the third round - the preliminary final - where they play the losing team in the qualifying semi-final.  The winners of the qualifying semi-final go straight through to the play-off final where they play the winners of the preliminary final.

Team bracket

Week 1

Week 2

Week 3

Week 4

References

League 1
League 1
RFL League 1